The Wankhede Stadium is a cricket ground in Mumbai, India. It is the home of the Mumbai Cricket Association and is a Test, One Day International (ODI) and Twenty20 International (T20I) venue. It has a capacity of more than 33,000 spectators. The ground has hosted 23 Test matches, the first in 1975 when India played the West Indies. It has also staged 20 ODI matches, the first of which was in 1987 when India faced Sri Lanka. One T20I has been played at the ground between India and England in 2012. Of the 20 ODIs played at the stadium, 6 have been World Cup matches (including the 2011 World Cup Final), with the stadium playing host to at least one match whenever the World Cup has been played in India.

West Indian batsman Roy Fredericks became the first Test centurion at the Wankhede Stadium when he made 104 against India in the maiden Test match at the venue in 1975. The record for the highest Test century at the ground belongs to Clive Lloyd who made an unbeaten 242 in the same match. The highest score by an Indian at the ground is 224 which was made by Vinod Kambli against England in 1993.

Indian batsman Mohammad Azharuddin scored the first ODI century at the ground in the ground's first ODI match in 1987 against Sri Lanka. The highest individual ODI score at the Wankhede Stadium is 151 not out scored by Sri Lankan Sanath Jayasuriya against India in 1997. Only two ODI centuries have been scored by Indian batsmen at the venue, with the highest being a score of 114 made by Sachin Tendulkar against South Africa in 1996.

As of November 2015, a total of 36 Test centuries and 13 ODI centuries have been made at the venue. Former India batsman Sunil Gavaskar, who has scored five international centuries at the Wankhede Stadium, holds the record for most centuries at the venue.

Test centuries

The following table summarises the Test centuries scored at the Wankhede Stadium.

One Day International centuries

The following table summarises the One Day International centuries scored at the Wankhede Stadium.

Twenty20 International

The following table summarises the Twenty20 International scored at the Wankhede Stadium.

See also
 List of international cricket centuries at Brabourne Stadium

References 

Centuries
Wankhede
Cricket in Mumbai